Rinat Sayarovich Bilyaletdinov (born 17 August 1957) is a Russian professional football coach and a former player who is an assistant coach with Khimki. He is of Tatar descent.

Coaching career
From 2014 to 2015, he managed the Russian Premier League club Rubin Kazan.

On 12 January 2018, he was signed by the last-place Russian Premier League club FC SKA-Khabarovsk. After 4 games at the helm in which SKA scored no goals and gained only 1 point, he left the club on 31 March 2018 by mutual consent.

Personal life
He is the father of midfielder Diniyar Bilyaletdinov.

References

External links
 

1957 births
Living people
Tatar sportspeople
Soviet footballers
Russian footballers
Russian Premier League players
Russian expatriate footballers
Expatriate footballers in the Czech Republic
FC Lokomotiv Moscow players
FC Shinnik Yaroslavl players
Russian football managers
FC Lokomotiv Moscow managers
FC Rubin Kazan managers
Russian Premier League managers
Tatar people of Russia
Footballers from Moscow
Honoured Coaches of Russia
Association football midfielders
PFC CSKA Moscow players
FC SKA-Khabarovsk managers
FC Spartak Kostroma players
FC Znamya Truda Orekhovo-Zuyevo players